Charles Round (3 September 1885 – 6 October 1945) was an English cricketer. He played two matches for Essex in 1921.

References

External links

1885 births
1945 deaths
English cricketers
Essex cricketers
Sportspeople from Kensington